This is a list of the Czechoslovakia national football team games between 1920 and 1938, as well as the games that the nation played as Bohemia between 1903 and 1908 and as Bohemia & Moravia in 1939.

The Czechoslovakia national team was officially created in 1920, however, the first appearance of a Czech national team was in 1906, as the Bohemia selection. Czechoslovakia participated in the Inter-Allied Games in Paris in 1919 and won the tournament after beating the hosts France, in the final, but their first official game recognized by FIFA was at the 1920 Summer Olympics in Antwerp.

Between their first match in 1920 and 1938, when competitive football stopped because of the Second World War, Czechoslovakia played in 124 matches, resulting in 65 victories, 26 draws and 33 defeats. Throughout this period they played in the Central European International Cup four times between 1927 and 1938 with Yugoslavia's best result being a runner-up finish in the inaugural edition in 1927–30. They also played in two Olympic football tournaments in 1920 and 1924, with Czechoslovakia reaching the final on the former, where they lost to hosts Belgium. Czechoslovakia also qualified through to two FIFA World Cups, the 1934 and 1938 editions, reaching the final of the former, where they once again lost to the hosts, Italy.

Results

Bohemia national team

1919 Inter-Allied Games

The Czechoslovakia national football team

1920

1921

1922

1923

1924

1925

1926

1927

1928

1929

1930

1931

1932

1933

1934

1935

1936

1937

1938

The Bohemia & Moravia national football team

1939

See also
Czech Republic national football team results (1994–2019)
Czech Republic national football team results (2020–present)

Notes

References

External links
Results at RSSSF 

1920s in Czechoslovakia
1930 in Czechoslovakia